The Boschstraatkwartier is a neighbourhood in the old city centre of Maastricht, Limburg, Netherlands.

History
The neighbourhood got its name after the old Boschpoort (English: Den Bosch Gate), one of the seven former city gates of Maastricht. The Boschpoort gate and the outlying defense works were demolished in the 1860s when Maastricht ceased to be a fortress town.

Impressions

Neighbourhoods of Maastricht